Bruno is a first name and surname of Old Germanic origin. In the Latin languages it comes from Brunus, a Latinized form of a Germanic name composed of the root brun-, which can mean burnished (polished, with luste) and also moreno, also present in the words braun (in German) and brown (in English). 

It is also very frequent in Italy, where it has been documented since the 8th century and whose spread is mainly due to several saints, such as Bruno of Cologne (1030–1101), a monk born in the city of Cologne.

Given the popularity of the given name in Italy, as a result of patronymic tradition, the surname "Bruno" and its numerous variants are also recurrent, such as Bruce, Brunacci, Brunaldi, Brundu, Brunari, Brunella, Brunelleschi, Brunelli, Brunello, Brunengo, Bruneri, Brunese, Brunetti, Brunex, Brunetto, Bruni, Brunini, Brunoldi, Brunone, Brunotti, Brunei, etc.

It occurs in continental Europe, United States, Canada, Latin America (including both Spanish-speaking countries and Brazil) and Oceania as a given name to men and boys. Bruno is most common in Italy. Bruno is the 11th most common surname in Italy.

Given name

People

Medieval world
 Bruno, Duke of Saxony (died 880)
 Bruno the Great (925–965), Archbishop of Cologne, Duke of Lotharingia and saint
 Bruno (bishop of Verden) (920–976), German Roman Catholic bishop
 Pope Gregory V (c. 972–999), born Bruno of Carinthia
 Bruno of Querfurt (c. 974–1009), Christian missionary bishop, martyr and saint
 Bruno of Augsburg (c. 992–1029), Bishop of Augsburg
 Bruno (bishop of Würzburg) (1005–1045), German Roman Catholic bishop
 Pope Leo IX (1002–1054), born Bruno of Egisheim-Dagsburg
 Bruno II (1024–1057), Frisian count or margrave
 Bruno the Saxon (fl. 2nd half of the 11th century), historian
 Bruno of Cologne (d. 1101), founder of the Carthusians
 Bruno (bishop of Segni) (c. 1045–1123), Italian Roman Catholic bishop and saint
 Bruno (archbishop of Trier) (died 1124), German Roman Catholic bishop
 Bruno II of Berg (c. 1100–1137), Archbishop of Cologne and chips

Modern world

A–G
 Bruno Bauer (1809–1882), German philosopher
 Bruno Bozzetto (born 1938), Italian animator
 Bruno Branciforte (born 1947), Italian admiral
 Bruno Caboclo (born 1995), Brazilian basketball player
 Bruno Campos (born 1973), Brazilian actor
 Bruno Carabetta (born 1966), French judoka 
 Bruno Carranza (1822–1891), former President of Costa Rica
 Bruno Cheyrou, French footballer, older brother of Benoit Cheyrou
 Bruno Corbucci (1931–1996), Italian film director
 Bruno Cortês (born 1987), Brazilian football player
 Bruno de Finetti (1906–1985), Italian probabilist and statistician
 Bruno Fernandes (footballer, born 1994), Portuguese football player
 Bruno Fernando (born 1998), American basketball player
 Bruno Forte (born 1949), Italian theologian and ecclesiastic
 Bruno Gagliasso (born 1982), Brazilian actor
 Bruno Gama (born 1987), Portuguese football player
 Bruno Ganz (1941–2019), Swiss actor
 Bruno Gerussi (1928–1995), Canadian actor
 Bruno Ghedina (1943–2021), Italian ice hockey player
 Bruno Giacomelli (born 1952), Formula 1 driver
 Bruno Giacometti (1907–2012) Swiss architect
 Bruno Giordano (born 1956), Italian football player and a coach
 Bruno Gissoni (born 1986), Brazilian actor
 Bruno Gonçalves Kischinhevsky (born 1994), known as Bruno, Brazilian football midfielder
 Bruno Grandi (1934–2019), Italian gymnast and president of the International Gymnastics Federation
 Bruno Guimarães (born 1997), Brazilian football midfielder
 Bruno Gutzeit (born 1966), French butterfly swimmer

H–M
 Bruno Richard Hauptmann (1899–1936), perpetrator of the Lindbergh kidnapping
 Bruno Heller (born 1960), English screenwriter
 Bruno Heppell (born 1972), Canadian football player
 Bruno Herrero Arias, Spanish football player
 Bruno Hochmuth (1911–1967) American general
 Bruno Hussar (1911–1996), Catholic priest
 Bruno St. Jacques, Canadian ice hockey player
 Bruno Jalander (1872–1966), Finnish military officer
 Bruno Junk (1929–1995), Estonian racewalker
 Bruno Kirby (1949–2006), American actor
 Bruno Kreisky (1911–1990), Austrian chancellor from 1970 to 1983
 Bruno Langley (born 1987), British actor
 Bruno Latour (1947-2022), French sociologist and cultural theorist
 Bruno Lauzi (1937–2006), Italian singer-songwriter
 Bruno Leoni (1913–1967), Italian political philosopher (classical liberalism) and lawyer
 Bruno Lucia, Australian stand-up comedian and performer
 Bruno Lüdke (1908–1944), German alleged prolific serial killer
 Bruno Lukk (1909–1991), Estonian pianist and pedagogue
 Bruno Magli, Italian shoe designer
 Bruno Mars, American singer-songwriter and music producer
 Bruno Mattei (1931–2007), Italian film director
 Bruno (footballer, born 1989), full name Bruno Moreira Silva, Brazilian footballer
 Bruno (footballer, born 1999), full name Bruno Moreira Soares, Brazilian footballer
 Bruno Munari (1907–1998), Italian industrial designer

N–Z
 Bruno (footballer, born 1994), full name Bruno Nogueira Barbosa, Brazilian football player
 Bruno Neri (1910–1944) Italian football player and partisan
 Bruno Nolasco (born 1986), Brazilian water polo player
 Bruno Rezende (born 1986), Brazilian volleyball player
 Bruno Panzacchi (born 1987), Salvadoran writer
 Bruno Prevedi (1928–1988) Italian opera singer
 Bruno Renan Trombelli (born 1991), Brazilian football player
 Bruno Rossi (1905–1993), Italian-American experimental physicist
 Bruno Ruffo (1920–2007), Italian motorcycle road racer
 Bruno S. (1932–2010), German film actor, artist and musician Bruno Schleinstein 
 Bruno Saby (born 1949), French racer
 Bruno (footballer, born 1980), full name Bruno Saltor Grau, Spanish former football player
 Bruno Sammartino (1935–2018) Italian-American wrestler
 Bruno Sassi (born 1970), American wrestler
 Bruno Schulz (1892–1942) Polish writer
 Bruno Senna (born 1983), Brazilian race car driver
 Bruno Soriano (born 1984), Spanish football player
 Bruno (footballer, born 1984), full name Bruno Fernandes das Dores de Souza, Brazilian football player and convicted murderer
 Bruno Steinhoff (born 1937), German businessman
 Bruno Tabacci (born 1946), Italian politician
 Bruno Tonioli (born 1955), Italian dancer and choreographer
 Bruno (footballer, born 1970), full name Bruno Alexandre Vaza Ferreira, Portuguese former football player
 Bruno Walter (1876–1962), German conductor and composer
 Bruno Zebie (born 1995), Canadian soccer player
 Bruno Zevi (1918–2000), Italian architect
 Bruno Zumino (1969–2014), Italian theoretical physicist

Fictional characters 
 the title character of Bruno (webcomic), by Christopher Baldwin
 Bruno Azrael, a fictional character in the anime Gundam SEED Destiny
 Bruno the Bear, a rival of Bugs Bunny in the Warner Brothers short Big Top Bunny
 Bruno the Bear, in the TV series Edward and Friends
 Brake Car Bruno, a caboose in Thomas & Friends: All Engines Go
 Bruno the Bigfoot, in the Sam & Max Hit the Road computer game
 the lead character of Bruno the Kid, a 1990s animated series
 Bruno, in the Sesame Street television show
 Bruno, from Lewis Carroll's novel Sylvie and Bruno
 Bruno, in the 2006 novel The Boy in the Striped Pyjamas
 Bruno, a robot from Mega Man Legends
 Bruno, a bear character in the animated series Total Drama
 Bruno, a dog in the 1950 Disney animated film Cinderella
 Bruno, 1930s animated cartoon pet dog belonging to Bosko
 Bruno, in the Pokémon video games
 Bruno Antony, the villain of Alfred Hitchcock's film Strangers on a Train
 Bruno Bucciarati, in the Japanese manga JoJo's Bizarre Adventure
 Bruno Cortona, in the 1948 film The Easy Life
 Bruno di Marco, in the British soap opera EastEnders
 Brüno Gehard, portrayed by Sacha Baron Cohen on television and in the 2009 film Brüno
 Bruno Gianelli, in the TV series The West Wing
 Bruno J. Global, in the Japanese anime Macross
 Bruno Madrigal, one of the main protagonists of Encanto
 Bruno Mannheim, a DC Comics character
 Bruno Martelli, in the TV series Fame
 Bruno Martinez, in the video game Grim Fandango
 Bruno Ricci, in the 1948 film Bicycle Thieves
 Bruno Sheppard, an antagonist in 1985 animated show M.A.S.K.
 Bruno von Falk, in the novel Suite Française and the 2015 film of the same name
 Bruno Von Stickle, in Disney's Herbie Goes to Monte Carlo (1977)
 Captain Bruno, a bear and captain of The Submarine Nautilus, in the movie Felix: Ein Hase Weltreise or Felix: All Around The World
 Bruno Carrelli (Earth-616),Kamala Khan's friend in Ms. Marvel Comics and Disney+ Series

Surname

People
 Alessio Bruno (born 1994) Italian footballer
 Billi Bruno (born 1997), actress
 Angelo Bruno (1911–1980), former boss of the Philadelphia crime family
 Chris Bruno (born 1966), actor
 Dylan Bruno (born 1972), American actor
 Federico Bruno (born 1993), Argentine distance runner
 Francesco Bruno (born 1968), Italian sport shooter
 Francesco Faà di Bruno (1825–1888), Italian mathematician and priest
 Frank Bruno (born 1961), boxer
 Gioia Bruno (born 1963), American musician
 Giordano Bruno (1548–1600), Italian philosopher, priest, cosmologist and occultist, executed for heresy
 Giovanni Bruno (born 1988), Italian footballer
 Giuliana Bruno, academic and art writer
 J. Jon Bruno (1946–2021), Episcopal Bishop of Los Angeles
 Joseph Bruno (1929–2020), New York politician
 Michele Bruno (1941–2016), South African drag queen
 Nick Bruno (born 1951), eighth president of the University of Louisiana at Monroe
 Quentin Bruno, singer, dancer and actor 
 Robert R. Bruno Jr. (1945–2008), American artist, inventor and businessman
 Salvatore Bruno (born 1979), Italian football striker
 Sébastien Bruno (born 1974), French rugby union player
 Tony Bruno (born 1952), American sports talk radio host
 Tory Bruno (born 1961), aerospace executive and president and CEO of United Launch Alliance

Fictional characters
 Avilio Bruno, in the anime 91 Days
 Giorgio Bruno, in the video game Time Crisis 4

See also
 Saint Bruno (disambiguation)

Sammarinese given names
Albanian masculine given names
Croatian masculine given names
Dutch masculine given names
English masculine given names
Estonian masculine given names
French masculine given names
German masculine given names
Italian-language surnames
Italian masculine given names
Irish masculine given names
Polish masculine given names
Portuguese masculine given names
Spanish masculine given names
Swiss masculine given names